Ryan John Watson (born 29 September 1994) is a New Zealand cricketer. He made his List A debut on 17 November 2019, for Central Districts in the 2019–20 Ford Trophy. He made his Twenty20 debut on 13 December 2019, for Central Districts in the 2019–20 Super Smash.

References

External links
 

1994 births
Living people
New Zealand cricketers
Central Districts cricketers
Place of birth missing (living people)